The Gran Premio Polla de Potrillos is a Group I flat race for three-year-old colts and geldings, run over a distance of 1600 metres every September in Maroñas racetrack in Montevideo, Uruguay. It is the first leg (together with the Polla de Potrancas) of the Uruguayan Triple Crown for three-year-olds.

References
 Gran  Premio Polla de Potrillos (Uruguayan 2000 Guineas)

Horse races in Uruguay
Flat horse races for three-year-olds

es:Polla de Potrillos#Polla de Potrillos de Uruguay